Sundown is a hamlet located within Denning, in Ulster County, New York, United States. It is 34.6 miles from the city of Kingston and 119 miles from New York City. Sundown is near the southern town line of Denning on CR 46.

References

Hamlets in Ulster County, New York
Rondout Creek